"Ischyrosaurus" (meaning "strong lizard", for its large humerus; name in quotation marks because it is preoccupied) was a genus of sauropod dinosaur from the Kimmeridgian-age Upper Jurassic Kimmeridge Clay of Dorset, England.

History and taxonomy
"Ischyrosaurus" is based on a partial humerus (NHMUK R41626) found in 1868.  John Hulke described it briefly in 1869, then named it in 1874. The genus is preoccupied by a name Edward Drinker Cope coined in 1869.

Like most sauropod remains from the Upper Jurassic-Lower Cretaceous of Europe, it was initially synonymized with Ornithopsis to create the new combination O. manseli, then wih Pelorosaurus as P. manseli. Upchurch et al., in their review of sauropods (2004), listed it as a dubious sauropod. A 2010 overview of Late Jurassic sauropods from Dorset noted that Ischyrosaurus shared features seen in both Rebbachisauridae and Titanosauriformes, but lacked features to nail down its exact phylogenetic position.

Paleobiology
As a sauropod, it would have been a large quadrupedal herbivore.

References

Sauropods
Kimmeridgian life
Late Jurassic dinosaurs of Europe
Jurassic England
Fossils of England
Fossil taxa described in 1874
Nomina dubia